The Drewe Arms is a Grade II* listed public house on the north side of The Square in Drewsteignton, Devon.

Built in the 17th century, the building was modernised in the late 19th century. There may have been a public house at the site in the 16th century. The building is made of cob on a stone base, with stone chimneystacks including one of granite. The roof is a combination of reed thatching, corrugated iron and slate. Built in a T-shape plan, the main area holds three rooms, a kitchen, a main room and a bar. There is a staircase at the rear of the centre room. It appears that the original building was an open hall house. The additional blocks were built in the late 19th and early 20th century, and include cellars and toilet facilities.

The interior was largely modernised in the 19th century, but no further modernisation has occurred and some of the 17th century woodwork remains. The deed dates for the Drewe Arms to 1890, when the public house was known as the "New Inn". The name was changed to the Druid Arms, and then to the Drewe Arms in the 1920s.

The building was designated Grade II* listed status on 22 February 1967. It is on the Campaign for Real Ale's National Inventory of Historic Pub Interiors. In 1919 the Drewe Arms was taken over by Mabel Mudge, who ran the public house for 75 years before retirement, giving her the record of the longest-serving landlady in the UK. The pub shut in February 2013, owing to the high costs of maintaining the place with a small profit margin, but reopened the same year with new owners.

References

National Inventory Pubs
Grade II* listed pubs in Devon